Mohammed Aslam is an Indian playback singer. He is most known for his stage performance called "Aslam Nite" dedicated to Mohammed Rafi songs. He has performed across India and Persian Gulf countries, and is also a playback singer in the Tamil and Bollywood film industries.

Discography

Songs

External links
 
 http://www.thehindu.com/features/metroplus/in-raptures-over-rafi/article111355.ece
 http://www.ytalkies.com/mollywood-film-news/sachin-the-singer-turns-music-composer-with-aanandam

Tamil playback singers
Year of birth missing (living people)
Living people
Indian male playback singers